"How Do You Get Your Kicks" is a song by Australian pop-rock group Uncanny X-Men. The song was released in April 1983 as the group's debut single. It peaked at number 51 on the Kent Music Report.

The music video included footage from their performance of the song on Countdown.

Track listing 
7" Vinyl (Mushroom – K-9034)
 "How Do You Get Your Kicks" - 3:36
 "Superhero" - 2:30

Charts

References

Songs written by Greg Macainsh
Songs written by David Briggs (Australian musician)
1983 songs
1983 debut singles
Uncanny X-Men (band) songs
Mushroom Records singles